Miriam Vale railway station is located on the North Coast line in Queensland, Australia. It serves the town of Miriam Vale. It features a single platform with a wooden structure. Opposite lies a passing loop and disused siding.

Services
Miriam Vale is served by long-distance Traveltrain services; The Spirit of Queensland as a scheduled stop.  The Spirit of the Outback and Rockhamption Tilt Train stops here only if reservations has been pre-booked.

References

External links

Miriam Vale station Queensland's Railways on the Internet

Regional railway stations in Queensland
North Coast railway line, Queensland